Răzvan Philippe Onea (born 19 May 1998) is a Romanian professional footballer who plays as a right back for Liga I club Rapid București.

Club career

Politehnica Iași
In the summer of 2019, Onea moved to first league club Politehnica Iași for an undisclosed fee, and later signed a five year deal with the club. On 31 August, he made his Liga I debut in a 3–2 away defeat at Gaz Metan Mediaș.

Career statistics

Club

References

External links
 
 Răzvan Onea at Statisticsfootball.com

1998 births
Living people
Footballers from Paris
French people of Romanian descent
People from Maramureș County
Romanian footballers
Association football forwards
Liga I players
Liga II players
Liga III players
CS Afumați players
FC Politehnica Iași (2010) players
FC Rapid București players